Harm Rural District is a rural district (dehestan) in Juyom District, Larestan County, Fars Province, Iran. At the 2006 census, its population was 8,992, in 1,781 families.  The rural district has 12 villages.

References 

Rural Districts of Fars Province
Larestan County